Slættaratindur (English: Flat peak) is the highest mountain in the Faroe Islands, at an elevation of 880 metres. It is located in the northern part of Eysturoy, between the villages of Eiði, Gjógv, and Funningur. Funningur lies at the foot of the mountain, however, the summit is not visible from the village.

Its name means "flat summit".  It can be climbed in about four hours, and although the routes are steep, technical climbing skills are not necessary to reach the summit.  In clear weather, the summit gives views over the entire archipelago.  Slættaratindur is one of ten mountains in the Faroe Islands which rise to over 800m above sea level.  Gráfelli, the second-highest peak at 856 m, lies just to the north-east of Slættaratindur.

References

Mountains of the Faroe Islands